Gongbu (born 1933), also known as Konbu, Gonbu, or Gonpa, was the eighth person and first Tibetan to summit Mount Everest. 

Gongbu joined the People's Liberation Army in 1956, and joined a mountaineering team in 1958, consisting of both Chinese and Soviet mountaineers. For the next two years, the Chinese government planned a climb of Everest: Gongbu was assigned to logistics and road-building. One Chinese team failed to summit after reaching , Gongbu was assigned to the next team.

Finally, in May 1960, the Chinese team with Gongbu managed to perform the first climb of Everest from the north side. Prior expeditions turned back at the Second Step, but Gongbu's team used technical methods to overcome the challenge.

After the climb, Gongbu met Mao Zedong, and became a deputy director of the Sports Commission of Tibet.

Personal life 
He was married to Bai Ma (白玛).

References

Tibetan people
Chinese summiters of Mount Everest
Chinese mountain climbers
1933 births
Living people